The 2019 National Invitation Tournament (NIT) was a single-elimination tournament of 32 NCAA Division I men's college basketball teams that were not selected to participate in the 2019 NCAA tournament. The tournament started on March 19, and concluded on April 4. The first three rounds were played on campus sites with the higher seeded team acting as host. The semifinals and championship game were held at Madison Square Garden in New York City.

Experimental rules
On February 22, 2019, the NCAA announced a set of experimental rules that were used in this edition of the NIT.

The following rules were also used in the 2018 NIT:
 The free-throw lane was widened from the current college standard of 12 feet to the NBA standard of 16 feet.
 After an offensive rebound, the shot clock was reset to 20 seconds instead of the current NCAA standard of 30.

A set of rules relating to free throws that had been used in the 2017 NIT were used again in the 2019 edition, with one modification:
 Team foul counts, for purposes of determining bonus free throws, were reset to zero at the 10-minute mark of each half, effectively dividing the game into quarters for that purpose. This mirrored the current practice in NCAA women's basketball, which has been played in quarters since the 2015–16 season.
 The "one-and-one" was eliminated. All bonus free throw situations resulted in two free throws for the non-fouled team. 
 Teams entered the bonus upon the fifth team foul in each 10-minute segment.
 The team foul count was reset to zero at the start of any overtime period. Teams entered the bonus upon the fourth team foul in an overtime period.
 In a completely new feature, the NCAA adopted the NBA's bonus rule regarding team fouls in the last 2 minutes of any period. Teams entered the bonus on the second team foul in the last 2 minutes of a 10-minute segment or overtime period, regardless of the total team foul count at that point of the period.

Notes

Participants

Automatic qualifiers
The following teams were guaranteed berths into the 2019 NIT field by having the best regular season record in their conference but failing to win their conference tournament. Such teams were eligible to receive an at-large berth into the NCAA Tournament but did not.

At-large bids
The following teams were also awarded NIT berths.

Seeds

Bracket

* Denotes overtime period

Media

ESPN, Inc. had exclusive television rights to all of the NIT Games. It telecast every game across ESPN, ESPN2, ESPNU, and ESPN3. Westwood One had exclusive radio rights to the semifinals and the championship.

See also
2019 Women's National Invitation Tournament

References

National Invitation
National Invitation Tournament
2010s in Manhattan
National Invitation Tournament
Basketball competitions in New York City
College sports in New York City
Madison Square Garden
National Invitation Tournament
National Invitation Tournament
Sports in Manhattan